Myanaung Township is a township of Hinthada District in the Ayeyarwady Division of Myanmar.

See also
List of villages in Myanaung Township

References

Townships of Ayeyarwady Region